The Jacksonville Film Festival is an annual film festival held in Jacksonville, Florida. Founded in 2002, the festival screens in competition and out-of-competition American and international independent films. According to the Daily Record, the festival is "an anticipated event among the international independent film community and an economic development driver for North Florida."

History
The Inaugural Jacksonville Film Festival debuted May 15–18, 2003 with the opening film The Flying Ace, made by Norman Studios in Jacksonville, Florida in 1926. In addition to screening films, the festival hosts panels, workshops and parties. Jacksonville Film Festival was conceived by Joan Monsky and Karen Sadler in the spring of 2002. They assembled a small advisory group of community leaders and arts advocates to create a mission and a template for the event which was ambitiously scheduled for May 2003. In that year Jacksonville Film Festival became a non-profit organization.

The Robin Shepherd Group designed the turtle logo and creative graphics, the city and the Times-Union declared their support, Preston Haskell contributed wisdom and encouragement (and more), and Erik Hart offered space and services at the Florida Theatre. Sponsors also took a leap of faith, and volunteers were generous with hours and hours of time and effort. Joan Monsky was elected president and brought in programmers to help guide the artistic vision. After long, arduous planning sessions, the First Annual Jacksonville Film Festival made its successful debut.

In 2003, The mission of the Festival was threefold: to connect Jacksonville to its early "Hollywood of the South" moviemaking roots, to focus attention on independent film and filmmakers, and to contribute to the revitalization of downtown Jacksonville. Six downtown venues hosted films, parties and special events including the popular Entertainment Law Panel and Viva Cinema. Downtown was also alive with movie buffs, movie stars and movie guests.

A year later in 2004, Bill Murray received the honor of the Tortuga Verde Award for Lifetime Achievement. The screening of Napoleon Dynamite got world-wide press for the seasons biggest hit film and Director Christopher Coppola screened his latest film "The Creature of Sunnyside Trailer Park" at the historic Florida Theater.

In 2005,  The festival added new initiatives: Books Alive!, a monthly program in partnership with the Jacksonville Public Library, celebrating family films derived from literature and REEL People, the film festival "fan club" offering year-round screenings of diverse and unique films never before seen in Jacksonville.

In 2006, John Travolta's film Lonely Hearts was the headline film in the 2006 Jacksonville Film Festival.

In 2007, the Jacksonville Film Festival celebrated its fifth year. The festival has been embraced by the city and is gaining increasing recognition in the Southeast as an important destination for the independent film community. A key to the success has been the festival commitment to offering "Something for Everyone!"

2008 will be known as the year of significant change. Jesse Rodriguez took the helm as Executive and program director, and along with the board of directors, extended the festival to a full week incorporating programs such as A TASTE OF ASIA, EUROPA EUROPA, HIP HOP FOR THE MASSES, as well as A MOMENT OF SILENCE PLEASE, a film program for the Deaf. The concept for a FILM FESTIVAL VILLAGE was also realized making all the venues and hotel within walking distance of each other. Now as an international film festival, over 20 countries were represented through cinema in 2008.

In 2018, Jacksonville Film Festival returned in September 2018 after a six-year hiatus.

References

External links
 
Festival Archive
IMDB Festival Profile

Tourist attractions in Jacksonville, Florida
Culture of Jacksonville, Florida
Film festivals in Florida
Film festivals established in 2002
2002 establishments in Florida
Events in Jacksonville, Florida